During the 2012 Australian Football League (AFL) season, 122 Australian rules footballers made their AFL debut with a further 32 playing their first game for a new club.  The Greater Western Sydney Giants, who joined the league in 2012, had the most debutantes with 36, with Geelong next highest with 10.

Summary

AFL debuts

Change of AFL club

References

Australian rules football records and statistics
Australian rules football-related lists
Debut